Gamia buchholzi, commonly known as the grand skipper, is a species of butterfly in the family Hesperiidae. It is found in Sierra Leone, Ivory Coast, Ghana, Nigeria, Cameroon, Gabon, the Republic of the Congo, the Central African Republic, the Democratic Republic of the Congo, Uganda, western Kenya and north-western Tanzania. The habitat consists of forests.

Adults are attracted to flowers.

The larvae feed on Borassus aethiopum, Phoenix reclinata, Raphia monbuttorum, Raphia farinifera and Dracaena species (including Dracaena arborea).

References

Butterflies described in 1879
Astictopterini
Butterflies of Africa